The TRS-80 Model II is a computer system launched by Tandy in October 1979, and targeted at the small-business market. It is not an upgrade of the original TRS-80 Model I, but a new system.

The Model II was succeeded by the compatible TRS-80 Model 12, Model 16, Model 16B, and the Tandy 6000.

Model II

Background
Tandy was surprised at the strong demand for the TRS-80 Model I from business purchasers. The computer was too limited for such use, so the company began development on the Model II in late 1978. It was announced in May 1979, deliveries began in October, and only Tandy-owned Radio Shack stores sold the computer. Tandy advertised the Model II as "a business computer — not a hobby, 'home' or personal computer". It claimed that the computer was "ideal for a small business, and also 'just right' for many time-consuming jobs within larger businesses", including those with mainframes or minicomputers.

Hardware

As a professional business machine, the Model II used state-of-the-art hardware and had numerous features not found in the primitive Model I such as the high-speed (for the time) 4 MHz Z80A, DMA, vectored interrupts, a detachable keyboard with two function keys and numeric keypad, and port instead of memory-mapped I/O. It sported 80x25 text and a single-sided 500 KB 8" floppy drive, and either 32 or 64k of RAM, along with two RS-232 ports and a Centronics-standard parallel port. The video memory could be banked out of Z80 memory, so that the entire 64 KB address space could be used for main memory. Unlike most computers, it had no BIOS ROM except a small boot loader (the BIOS was loaded off the boot floppy). Because of this and the use of port I/O, almost all of the Model II's memory could be used by software. The Model II ran the TRSDOS operating system (renamed to TRSDOS-II starting with version 4.0) and BASIC. The different disk format and system architecture made it impossible to run Model I/III software on the Model II, thus it never had as much available. This was somewhat mitigated by the availability of the CP/M operating system for the Model II from third parties such as Pickles & Trout. Unlike the Model I/III, the Model II's memory map is compatible with standard CP/M-80. Three internal expansion slots could be used for add-on cards such as additional serial ports and a video board that allowed bitmap graphics.

The floppy drive included with the Model II was a Shugart SA-800 full-height, single-sided 8" drive; like most such drives, it spun continuously whether the disk was being accessed or not and the spindle motor was powered directly off the A/C line. The floppy controller in the Model II was a double-density, soft-sector unit based on the WD 1791 floppy controller. Like with the Model I/III/IV, boot disks on the Model II required Track 0 to be single density. CDC drives were used for the floppy expansion module.

The keyboard was a capacitive keyboard made by  Keytronic Corporation. Like most capacitive keyboards, it utilized a key mechanism with foam rubber disks; these are prone to dry-rotting with age and requiring replacement. A later version of the keyboard was made by Cherry Corporation, but still used the capacitive technology rather than the more well-known Cherry mechanical keyswitches.

The disk format on the Model II closely followed the IBM 3740 standard, which specified 77 tracks, 26 sectors per track, soft sector formatting, and a sector size of 128 bytes for a formatted capacity of about 250k, however the Model II had a double density controller, so the disk format used 256 byte sectors and formatted capacity was about 492k. If users installed a double sided drive, they could get 1MB of space, however this required a modified DOS and Radio Shack did not officially support the use of double sided drives on the Model II.

There were several hardware revisions to the Model II over its lifespan. The first revision models (1979–80) could not boot from a hard disk and the floppy controller required a terminating resistor pack for the last drive on the chain in place of the standard method of putting a terminating resistor pack on the internal disk drives. The external resistor pack worked by looping back the I/O lines on the external floppy connector to the SA-800 drive's terminator pins. This unusual setup was chosen so the users would not have to remove the cover and install or remove a terminating resistor pack on the floppy drive every time they wanted to remove or attach external disk drives. It proved to be problematic since customers who lost their resistor packs could not use their machines (Radio Shack sold replacement packs for $50) and Model IIs sold from 1981 onward used a different floppy controller that did not require it. Hard disks offered for the Model II also used a terminating resistor pack. These were sold as master and slave drives, with the master hard disk (which had the resistor pack) needing to be the last one on the chain. Like most hard disks offered on 8-bit computers, there was no subdirectory support and the drive was simply treated by the OS as a giant and speedy floppy disk.

Unlike the Model I/III, the Model II also had a case fan due to the heat generated by the 8" floppy drive's continuously running spindle motor. The combined effect of the case fan and the floppy motor resulted in an extremely noisy computer compared to the nearly silent Model I/III.

The video display in the Model II is similar to the Model I. A 12" B&W television CRT is used; the monitors were supplied by RCA and Motorola. However, the Model II's video circuitry was significantly improved in the interest of better picture quality, as one of the criticisms of the Model I was that the included monitor was merely an RCA television set with the RF, IF, and sound stripped out. The Model II, in contrast, used a dedicated monochrome composite monitor with higher-quality and better-adjusted components than the modified TV set provided with the Model I. The text display on the Model II was 80x24 rather than the Model I/III's 64x16 text and also added lowercase letters, one major feature that the Model I was lacking (originally; an upgrade was available later). In addition, it could be operated in 40x24 text mode. The character set in the Model II was somewhat different from the Model I/III. It included several mathematics and currency symbols and in place of the Model I/III's semigraphics characters had 30 characters (ASCII codes 128-158) for drawing lines and boxes. Reverse video characters were not available.

The Model II was similar to an S-100 machine in that it featured a passive backplane with eight expansion slots; four of these were normally occupied by the CPU card, floppy controller, keyboard/video card, and RAM. A separate PCB in the back of the machine contained two RS-232 ports and a Centronics port. Although the expansion slots look similar to an S-100 slot, they were a proprietary design and could not be used with S-100 boards.

Various expansion cards for the remaining four slots included a hard disk controller, networking card, a 68000 CPU board that could address up to 256 KB memory, and a board for pixel-addressable graphics with 640 by 240 resolution. It could overlay the text screen with the bitmapped display. The same graphics board (catalog number 26-4104) could be fitted to the later Models 12 and 16. It came with a modified BASIC providing rudimentary screen drawing capabilities like line, box and circle drawing, shading and filling, a viewport capability and array transfer between graphics RAM and CPU RAM.

The Model II architecture theoretically supported up to 512K RAM via a bank-switchable upper 32K page segment (up to fifteen 32K pages were supported).  However,  the machine did not provide enough card slots to physically upgrade the RAM to 512K. This was because RAM was provided via 32k or 64k cards and only a few open card slots were available on a standard Model II, since the basic configuration of the machine took up four slots. This deficiency was rectified with the Model 12, which could accommodate up to 768 KB RAM using the newer 4164 DRAM chips and a revised bank-switching scheme.

A special-purpose expansion card was the 64K Memory Expansion Board (catalog number 26-4105) which allowed the Model II (without the expensive Model 16 upgrade) to run a special version of the Visicalc spreadsheet called Enhanced Visicalc. This made available larger worksheets by using banked memory beyond the Z80's base 64 KB.

Some of the technical advances first introduced on the Model II such as the WD 1791 floppy controller and the improved video circuitry would later go into the Model III.

Despite being designed primarily for business or operating factory equipment, the Model II did have a handful of games available; notably the Scott Adams Adventure series were offered for it. In addition, CP/M versions of Infocom text adventures would run.

It could hold an additional three  disk drives or up to four  hard drives (the Model II allowed three external floppy drives to be daisy-chained to it).

BASIC interpreter
The Model II was provided with an implementation of Microsoft BASIC closely derived from Level II BASIC on the Model I/III, but with a number of differences and enhanced features. Unlike the Model I/III, the Model II's BASIC was entirely RAM-resident and loaded from disk. It was 17k in size, approximately the same size as Model I/III Disk BASIC.

While Model I/III BASIC include a startup prompt asking if the user would like to reduce BASIC's memory area (typically done if some memory is to be reserved for machine language routines), Model II BASIC instead has this feature as a command line option (M:address) when started from the TRS-DOS prompt. If the user is planning to run a BASIC program that performs file handling, it is also required to specify the number of open files at startup via the F:files option. A BASIC program may also be specified at startup for automatic loading and execution.

In Model I/III BASIC, the text cursor is positioned via the statement  which refers to an absolute coordinate on the screen. Model II BASIC instead accepts a row and column position (thus  instead of ). Model II BASIC still limits variable names to two characters as support for long variable names in Microsoft BASIC did not appear until BASIC-80 5.x in 1981. BASIC programs may be saved in ASCII in addition to tokenized format. The ERASE command is used to clear all array variables.

Model II BASIC operates in one of two display modes depending on the last character displayed. In Scroll Mode (invoked if the last character displayed had an ASCII value from 32-127), text will scroll off the screen when the bottom is reached or wrap around to the next line on the left when the right side of the screen is reached. In Graphics Mode (ASCII value from 128-159), BASIC wraps the screen around when the bottom row or rightmost column is reached.

As with all pre-v5.x implementations of BASIC-80, Model II BASIC does not reserve string space automatically and the CLEAR statement must be used at the start of a program to reserve it.

The SYSTEM command, used to exit BASIC, may also be used to "pass" a command to TRS-DOS without exiting and losing the program currently in memory; this is most commonly done for tasks such as viewing the disk directory.

It was possible to regain most of this functionality by using the extremely similar MBASIC provided with CP/M. The MEM command, used in Model I/III BASIC to display the amount of free BASIC memory, was removed and its functionality merged into the FRE function.

Other programming languages

Microsoft made available its Fortran, Cobol and BASIC compilers, as well as its MACRO-80 assembler. All were sold through Radio Shack. Later the simpler, more affordable Series I editor/assembler package from Radio Shack itself, familiar to many Model I hobbyists, was offered for the Model II. Radio Shack also had its own macro assembler product, Assembly Language Development System, or popularly known as ALDS. This product was later reworked and sold for the Model 4.

Applications software
Wayne Green estimated that sales of the Model II  were about 10% of the Model I, discouraging third-party developers from creating software for the more expensive computer; the small software library, in turn, discouraged sales of the Model II. He described Tandy's software support for the Model II as "less than dynamic", because of the company's focus on the Model III. Tandy produced and marketed various Model II business applications ranging from accounting, medical office, legal office, payroll, inventory, order entry, and sales analysis, to general-purpose applications for word processing, database management, and later spreadsheet work. Some were produced in-house (like the Scripsit word processor), others licensed and branded as Radio Shack products (like the Profile database), and still others marketed by Radio Shack, such as VisiCalc. The company also offered products facilitating data transfer with IBM mainframe computers.

Model 12

The Model II was replaced in 1982 by the TRS-80 Model 12, which has half-height ("thinline") double-sided floppy drives, and integrates most of the Model II electronics into a single main board. The video and keyboard card plugged into a single slot in the main board. An expansion card cage was available as an option, allowing six more plug-in cards. The white phosphor CRT on the Model II was replaced with a green phosphor tube on the Model 12 for easier viewing and less eye strain. Its keyboard sported eight function keys. The Model 12 is essentially a Model 16B without the Motorola processor, and is upgradable to a Model 16B.

The Model 12 moved the Centronics and serial ports to a cluster on the rear left side of the computer.

Model 16

The TRS-80 Model 16 came out in February 1982 as the follow-on to the Model II; an upgrade kit was available for Model II systems. The Model 16 added a 6 MHz, 16/32-bit Motorola 68000 processor and memory card, keeping the original Z80 as an I/O processor, or as the main processor when 8-bit Model II software was loaded. It has two half-height ("thinline") double-sided 8-inch floppy drives, though the Model II upgrade does not replace the floppy drive.
The Model 16 can run either TRSDOS-16 or TRS-Xenix, a variant of Xenix, Microsoft's version of UNIX. TRSDOS-16 is a TRSDOS II-4.1 application providing a 68000 interface and support for up to three users, with no additional features and little compatible software. 68000 functionality was added as an extension, loading 68000 code into the 68000 memory via a shared memory window with the Z80.

By June 1982 the company had shipped 2,000 units to stores, with the majority unsold. Five months after its introduction, the computer still had no TRSDOS-16 applications; owners had to run Model II or CP/M software and applications. Its release forced the few developers of Model II software to "start all over again", Green said, because customers would not want to run Z80 software on the Model 16. Tandy admitted that it should have encouraged third-party software development, which resulted in the killer app VisiCalc for the Apple II. In 1983 VisiCorp produced an update of Visicalc which Tandy sold for the Model 16 called Enhanced VisiCalc. This version runs on the Z80 and uses banked memory beyond the base 64 KB for larger worksheets.

Rumors stated that Tandy would offer Xenix or another third-party operating system for the computer. In early 1983 the company indeed switched to Xenix, and offered it for free to existing customers; by mid-1983 an estimated 5,000 of 30,000 Model 16s ran Xenix. Xenix was based on UNIX System III, also supported up to three users, and was more established.

With Xenix, the Model 16 family became a popular system for small business, with a relatively large library of business and office automation software. Tandy offered multi-user word processing (Scripsit 16), spreadsheet (Multiplan), and a 3GL "database" (Profile 16, later upgraded to filePro 16+), as well as an accounting suite with optional COBOL source for customization. RM-COBOL, BASIC, and C were available for programming, with Unify and Informix offered as relational databases. A kernel modification kit was also available.

TRS-Xenix was notable for being a master/slave implementation, with all I/O being performed by the Z80 while all processing was done within the otherwise I/O-free 68000 subsystem.

Model 16B and Tandy 6000

The Model 16 evolved into the TRS-80 Model 16B with 256 KB in July 1983, and later in 1985 the Tandy 6000, gaining an internal hard drive along the way and switching to an 8 MHz 68000. Tandy offered 8.4 MB, 15 MB, 35 MB, and 70 MB external hard drives, up to 768 KB of RAM, and up to six additional RS-232 serial ports supporting multi-user terminals. An expansion board with 512 KB memory was offered for the 6000, raising the maximum total RAM to one megabyte. Additional memory and serial port expansion options were available from aftermarket companies.

The Model 6000 was referred to simply as the Tandy 6000 due to a marketing decision to move away from the Radio Shack and TRS-80 badges.

The 16B was the most popular Unix computer in 1984, with almost 40,000 units sold. In 1987, Tandy announced that the 6000 hardware would no longer be improved; customers believed that their systems had become orphaned technology. By 1988, Radio Shack had begun offering IBM-compatible 386 PCs for their professional line and finally retired the Model II family.

Reception
InfoWorld in 1981 called the Model II "a well-designed, capable business system" that "overcomes several limitations of the Model I". Creative Computing in 1984 called it a "state-of-the-art business machine" that "might have taken the business market by storm had it not had a nameplate reading 'Radio Shack.'"

BYTEs review in January 1984 stated that "the Model 16B is a fairly well-implemented and apparently well-supported Xenix system" that would likely receive much support from software developers. The authors said that it greatly improved on the Model I and III, and surprised them by being a very good small Unix development system. While criticizing Xenix's user unfriendliness for small business customers, and wondering "whether Radio Shack can or will invest" in training on the very sophisticated operating system for its dealers, they concluded that the Model 16B "deserves serious consideration". The magazine in August 1984 described the 16B as "a usable multiuser microcomputer system", but with a slow hard drive that might limit the computer to two users.

References

TRS-80
Microcomputers
Computer-related introductions in 1979